Idar Lind (born 23 September 1954) is a Norwegian novelist, crime fiction writer, songwriter and playwright.

Biography
Lind was born on the island of Otterøya (now part of Namsos) in Nord-Trøndelag county, Norway.  He made his literary debut in 1983 with Stengte dører.  He was awarded the Riverton Prize in 1989 for the crime novel 13 takters blues.

His crime novel Hotell Tordenskjold (1985) introduced the characters "Kristian António Steen", a hotel porter of Spanish descent, and police officer "Breheim", as detectives. The same detectives also solved crime problems in the sequels Ormens gift (1986) and  13 takters blues (1989). Further crime novels are Som to dråper blod (1993), Usynlige spor (1994), and Hysj (1996).

Lind published the song collection Bakfot bok in 1980. His plays include Korsvikaspillet (1995) and Skottet i Buvika (2008). The Drakeblod series (3 volumes 1988–1991) for young adults is set in the Viking Age.

References

1954 births
People from Namsos
Norwegian crime fiction writers
20th-century Norwegian novelists
21st-century Norwegian novelists
Norwegian male novelists
Norwegian dramatists and playwrights
Living people